The Sante River is an  stream on the Upper Peninsula of Michigan in the United States. Via the North Branch Otter River, Otter River, Sturgeon River and Portage River, its waters flow to Lake Superior.

See also
List of rivers of Michigan

References

Michigan  Streamflow Data from the USGS

Rivers of Michigan
Tributaries of Lake Superior